In population genetics, the four-gamete test is a  method for detecting historical recombination events.

Description 

Given a set of four or more sampled haploid chromosomes, the four-gamete test (FGT) detects recombination events by locating pairs of segregating sites that cannot have arisen without either recombination or a repeat mutation. Under the infinite-sites assumption (i.e. repeat mutations have zero probability), the probability of a repeat mutation is zero, and hence a recombination event is inferred. For example, if the data being studied consists of bi-allelic single-nucleotide polymorphism data, then the following configuration could be generated without recombination.

However, the following configuration cannot be generated without recombination.

The FGT detects a recombination event if the above configuration occurs in the data. The data in the above configuration is considered to be incompatible with any non-recombining ancestral history.

The FGT has low statistical power to detect recombination. Furthermore, the FGT is suitable only when the mutation rate is significantly smaller than the recombination rate. If the mutation rate is high, then the infinite-sites assumption is violated. For example, the FGT is generally suitable for human datasets, but is unsuitable for bacterial datasets.

See also

Genetic recombination
Coalescent theory

References

F